Stenoptilia aridus is a moth of the family Pterophoridae. It is found in the Mediterranean region and northern Africa and is a rare immigrant in more northern parts of Europe, including Belgium and Great Britain. It is also known from Central Asia, Yemen and Iran.

The wingspan is 18–19 mm. Adults are on wing from August to October in France.

The larvae feed on Misopates orontium and Kickxia spuria.

References

External links 
Fauna Europaea
Acta Naturalia Pannonica

aridus
Moths described in 1847
Plume moths of Africa
Plume moths of Asia
Plume moths of Europe
Taxa named by Philipp Christoph Zeller